Three ships of the Royal Navy have borne the name HMS Laertes, after either Laertes, a figure in Greek mythology, or Laertes, a character in Shakespeare's Hamlet:

 was a  destroyer launched as HMS Sarpedon in 1913, but renamed shortly afterwards. She was sold for breaking up in 1921.
 was an armed merchant trawler of the Royal Navy.
 was an  launched in 1944 and broken up in 1959.

Royal Navy ship names